Daniel Pae (born July 25, 1995) is an American politician who has served in the Oklahoma House of Representatives from the 62nd district since 2018. He attended Lawton High School, and he graduated from the University of Oklahoma with a master's degree in public administration. Prior to his election as a state representative, he was a part-time administrator for the City of Lawton, Oklahoma. At the time he was elected, he was the youngest member of the Oklahoma House of Representatives at 23 years of age. In the 2022 Oklahoma House of Representatives election, Pae's seat was uncontested.

Electoral History

References

1995 births
American politicians of Korean descent
Living people
Republican Party members of the Oklahoma House of Representatives
21st-century American politicians
Asian American and Pacific Islander state legislators in Oklahoma
Asian conservatism in the United States
People from Lawton, Oklahoma